Athamanta (or Athamantha) is a genus of flowering plant in the family Apiaceae. It is native to southern Europe and northern Africa.

Species
, Plants of the World Online accepted the following species:
Athamanta aurea (Vis.) Neilr.
Athamanta cortiana Ferrarini
Athamanta cretensis L.
Athamanta densa Boiss. & Orph.
Athamanta hispanica Degen ex Hervier
Athamanta macedonica (L.) Spreng.
Athamanta montana (Webb ex Christ) Spalik & Wojew. & S.R.Downie
Athamanta sicula L.
Athamanta vayredana (Font Quer) C.Pardo
Athamanta vestita A.Kern.

References

 NCBI taxonomy database
 ZipCodeZoo entry

Apioideae
Apioideae genera